Urbicus is Latin for "of the city" or "civic", and may refer to:
 Aggenus Urbicus, Roman technical writer
 Quintus Lollius Urbicus, Roman governor of Britain

See also